The 1923 Latvian Football Championship of the Latvian Higher League was contested by 6 teams with Kaiserwald winning the championship.

In the first stage, province group, LNJS from Liepāja won in the tournament of best teams from Kurzeme, Zemgale, Vidzeme and Latgale regions. In the second stage, Kaiserwald (Riga) defeated LNJS [Liepaja] 4-0.

League standings

References
 RSSSF

1923
Lat
Lat
Football Championship